James Gow may refer to:

 James Gow (scholar) 1854–1923), English scholar, educator, historian, and author
 James Gow (politician) (1862–1942), member of the New Zealand Legislative Council
 James Gow (writer) (1908–1952), American writer